Bhoga Srinivasa is a silver deity that is a near-replica of the main deity (Dhruva Bera) of the Tirumala Venkateswara Temple in Tirumala, Andhra Pradesh, India. The deity is also known as Manavalapperumal or Kautuka Bera. The deity is used daily for performing the Abhishekam ceremony (as part of Thomala Seva) and the Ekanta Seva. The deity is believed to imbibe the essence of the Dhruva Bera as well as grant devotees' wishes.

Bhoga Srinivasa was consecrated to the temple in 614CE by the Pallava queen Samavai (also known as Kadavan-Perundevi) along with donation of land and gold to the temple. The idol is a faithful copy of the Dhruva Bera except that the Shankha and Sudarshana Chakra are fixed in the case of Bhoga Srinivasa. On the pitham and below the feet of the deity is a Yantra that is in the shape of two interplaced equilateral triangle. The deity is connected permanently to the Dhruva Bera by means of a silk cord. When the deity is brought outside the sanctum sanctorum for deputising for the Dhruva Bera, the cord remains attached and is reinforced with gold links.

References

Tirumala Venkateswara Temple
Tirumala Idols